David Torraville has been the Bishop of Central Newfoundland since 2005.

Torraville was educated at Memorial University. He was a teacher for five years before being ordained in 1986. He was a Curate at Twillingate and then the incumbent at  St. Martin's Cathedral, Gander.

References 

Living people
Anglican bishops of Central Newfoundland
21st-century Anglican Church of Canada bishops
Memorial University of Newfoundland alumni
Year of birth missing (living people)